The Valparaíso earthquake of April 2017 was a strong earthquake that shook the cities of Valparaíso and Santiago on Monday, April 24, 2017, at 18:38 local time (21:38 UTC). Its epicenter was located off the coast of the Valparaíso Region and had a magnitude of 6.9 Mw. On the scale of Mercalli, the earthquake reached an intensity of VII (Very Strong).

Before this seismic event there was an unusual increase in seismic activity (seismic swarm) that began on Saturday, April 22 and before the event of magnitude 6.9 more than 180 foreshocks had been recorded, the strongest being that of magnitude 6.0 that occurred in the dawn of the April 22, 2017.

Subsequent to this event, more than 1000 aftershocks have been recorded, including several earthquakes of magnitude greater than 5.0 and two earthquakes of magnitude 5.8 and 6.0 on Moment magnitude scale that occurred on Friday, April 28, 2017, at 12:30 and 13:05 local time respectively.

Modified Mercalli intensities for some localities 
The earthquake was widely felt throughout the central zone of Chile and in at least two provinces of Argentina.

Intensities of the earthquake on the scale of Mercalli in Chile according to ONEMI.

Intensities of the earthquake on the scale of Mercalli in Argentina according to INPRES.

Earthquakes Foreshock 
The first foreshock quake was recorded at 19:46 (local time) and 22:49 (UTC) on April 22, and had a magnitude of 4.8 Mw, with epicenter 32 km west of Valparaíso and 28.1 km deep.

Aftershock 
After the earthquake more than 1000 aftershocks were registered, the largest one had a magnitude of 6.0 Mw, with an epicenter 14 kilometers south of Valparaíso and 25.9 kilometers deep.

Tectonic Summary 
The April 24, 2017, M6.9 earthquake west of Valparaiso, Chile, occurred as the result of thrust faulting on or near the subduction zone interface between the Nazca and Pacific plates. At the latitude of this event, the Nazca Plate is moving towards the east-northeast at a velocity of 74 mm/year with respect to South America, and begins its subduction beneath the continent at the Peru–Chile Trench, 80 km to the west of the April 24 earthquake. The size, location, depth and mechanism of this event are all consistent with its occurrence on the megathrust interface in this region.

While commonly plotted as points on maps, earthquakes of this size are more appropriately described as slip over a larger fault area. Events of the size of the April 24, 2017, earthquake are typically about 40x20 km in size (length x width).

Chile has a long history of massive earthquakes, including the 2010 M 8.8 Maule earthquake in central Chile, which ruptured a ~400 km long section of the plate boundary immediately south of this 2017 event. The April 24, 2017, earthquake lies close to where the Juan Fernández Ridge enters the subduction zone, in a section of the plate boundary that ruptured in a M 8.0 earthquake in March 1985, and previously in the 1906 M 8.2 Valparaiso earthquake (reported by some to be as large as M 8.6). To the north of the Juan Fernandez Ridge, the subduction zone last ruptured in the M 8.3 Illapel earthquake in September 2015. This subduction zone also hosted the largest earthquake on record, the 1960 M 9.5 earthquake in southern Chile. Over the century prior to the April 24, 2017, earthquake, the region within 400 km of this event has hosted 19 M 7+ earthquakes. Prior to the April 24 M 6.9 event, the region immediately surrounding this earthquake hosted 9 other events of M 4.5 or larger over the preceding 2 days, including a M 5.9 earthquake on April 23, 2017. The 6.9 shock was also preceded by 4 seconds by a M~4 foreshock. Within an hour of the M 6.9 earthquake, 4 aftershocks of M 4.7-5.4 had been located.

Magnitude of the earthquake 

This list includes information about the earthquake, which were measured by different seismological institutions worldwide.

Tsunami 

The National Office of Emergency of the Interior Ministry declared a tsunami warning for the coasts of the Valparaíso and O'Higgins regions. A few minutes later, the National Tsunami Service of Chile (SNAM, by its initials in Spanish), dependent on the Hydrographic and Oceanographic Service of the Chilean Navy (SHOA, by its initials in Spanish), ruled out the probability of a tsunami off the coast of Chile. However, if the tsunami was generated, according to the Pacific Tsunami Warning Center (PTWC) the maximum heights were; 16 cm in the city of Valparaíso and 10 cm in the commune of Quintero.

See also 
 List of earthquakes in 2017
 List of earthquakes in Chile

References 

2017 earthquakes
2017 in Chile
Valparaíso
Earthquakes in Chile